Joseph Octave Lemay (March 18, 1829 – December 12, 1892) was a businessman and political figure in Manitoba. He represented St. Norbert North from 1871 to 1874 and St. Vital from 1874 to 1878 in the Legislative Assembly of Manitoba.

He was born in Saint-Louis-de-Lotbiniere, Quebec, the son of Joseph Isaie Lemay. Lemay became an American citizen and was elected to the Minnesota Territorial House of Representatives for District 2 in 1854 as a Democrat. He also served as a justice of the peace for Minnesota. In 1855, Lemay married Marie Julie Camille Auger. He was put in charge of U.S. Customs for the town of Pembina, North Dakota. After an attack by the Sioux, Lemay moved to Upper Fort Garry and then St. Norbert, where he had a house built that eventually became the Asile Ritchot church building. He owned a steam mill and was also a land speculator. Lemay was heavyset and was said to require two chairs when he sat in the assembly. He was a founding member of the Winnipeg Board of Trade in 1873.

After his death, Lemay's property in St. Norbert was donated to the local Catholic church and was later used as an orphanage. The Ritchot Orphanage (in French, Asile Ritchot), named after Father Joseph-Noël Ritchot, is now a Manitoba historical site.

References 

1829 births
1892 deaths
People from Chaudière-Appalaches
Members of the Minnesota Territorial Legislature
Members of the Legislative Assembly of Manitoba
19th-century American politicians
19th-century Canadian politicians
19th-century Canadian businesspeople
American people of Canadian descent
American justices of the peace
United States Customs Service personnel
Businesspeople from Manitoba